Aryamala is a 1941 Indian Tamil-language film starring P. U. Chinnappa, M. S. Sarojini, M. R. Santhanalakshmi and T. S. Balaiah. Aryamala was a major box office success and established Chinnappa as a box office hero.

The same folk myth was produced again under the title Kathavarayan in 1958.

Plot 
This is a folk myth in which Lord Shiva produces a third son named Kathavarayan who is brought up by hunters. Kathavarayan falls in love with a celestial girl named Ilankanni. When Kathavarayan tries to make love to her, she drowns herself. But she is reborn as a princess. She is named as Aryamala. Kathavarayan falls in love with Aryamala. He tries many tricks changing his form into creatures. Once he turns into a parrot and goes to her palace. She becomes fond of the parrot. But he takes his usual form and ties knot to Aryamala while she is sleeping. Aryamala is shocked and she tries to drown herself again. But Lord Vishnu saves her. He turns her into a stone. But later when Kathavarayan touches the stone Aryamala regains her form. Kathavarayan is imprisoned by the King. However, Lord Vishnu intervenes and settles everything amicably. Kathavarayan and Aryamala are married and lived happily ever after.

Cast 
The following list was adapted from the film titles (See External links) and the song book

Male cast
P. U. Chinnappa  Kathavarayan
T. S. Balaiah  Balarayan
N. S. Krishnan  Chinnaan
Vasudeva Rao   Aryappoorajan
S. Krishna Sastri  Appa Pattar
V. V. S. Mani  Sri Krishnan
B. Rajagopala Iyer  Paramasivan
Kolathumani  Mannaru (Washerman)
K. R. Nagaraja Iyer  Somesa Arya
N. Thyagarajan   Hunters' King
Sivan  Beggar Boy

Female cast
M. R. Santhanalakshmi  Parvathi
M. S. Saroja  Aryamala
T. A. Mathuram  Aaravalli
A. Sakunthala  Sornamalai
Seethalakshmi  Thulasi Ammal
P. S. Gnanam  Vannaravalli
P. S. Chandra  Chinnarangam
A. R. Sakunthala  Vasanthi
L. Saroja  Malathi
M. K. Bapuji  Nirmala
S. R. Janaki  Kali Devi
T. M. Pattammal  Dancer

Soundtrack

Release 
Aryamala was released on 19 October 1941, and distributed by Narayanan & Company.

References

External links 

1940s Tamil-language films
1941 drama films
1941 films
Indian black-and-white films
Indian drama films
Films scored by G. Ramanathan